Astroblepus riberae is a species of catfish of the family Astroblepidae. This cavefish is endemic to the Cajamarca region in Peru.

Named in honor of Carles Ribera, University of Barcelona, a specialist in cavernicolous spiders, who collected the type specimen from Ninabamba caves in Peru.

References

Bibliography
Eschmeyer, William N., ed. 1998. Catalog of Fishes. Special Publication of the Center for Biodiversity Research and Information, num. 1, vol. 1–3. California Academy of Sciences. San Francisco, California, United States. 2905. .

Astroblepus
Fish described in 1994
Cave fish
Freshwater fish of Peru